Sääʹmođđâz (The Skolt News) is to date the world's only quarterly printed in the Skolt Sámi language.

History
Published four times a year, it was first printed in Finland in 1978 by editor-in-chief Satu Mosnikoff and several reporters and assistants. Sääʹmođđâz was distributed to every Skolt household and the members of the Skolt Supporters' Association as one way of disseminating the recently (1972) created orthography for the language. In addition, it was an important method of maintaining a sense of community in spite of the great distances between the three main Finnish Skolt communities of Sevettijärvi, Keväjärvi, and Nellim. The magazine had birth announcements, obituaries, wedding announcements, short stories written and illustrated by schoolchildren, news articles, official government and church announcements, and general interest stories. Each issue also had numerous photographs of the Skolt community. In spite of reaching the entire Skolt community residing in Finland, the last issue of Sääʹmođđâz was published in 1986 due to the difficulty of finding funding, a lack of reporters and the editor-in-chief being tired of publishing the magazine by herself.

References

External links
History of Sääʹmođđâz (in Finnish) and a PDF of the fall 1983 issue (in Skolt Sámi)

1978 establishments in Finland
1986 disestablishments in Finland
Defunct magazines published in Finland
Magazines established in 1978
Magazines disestablished in 1986
Quarterly magazines published in Finland
Sámi in Finland
Sámi magazines
Skolts